Jiřína Adamičková-Pelcová (born 22 November 1969) is a retired Czechoslovak, later Czech biathlete.

She has participated in three editions of the Winter Olympics (1992, 1994, 1998). Pelcová won the Overall World Cup in 1989–90 World Cup season. Pelcová claimed 2 medals at Biathlon World Championships: one gold and one bronze.

References

External links 
 IBU
 Jiřina Pelcová, sports-reference.com

1969 births
Biathletes at the 1992 Winter Olympics
Biathletes at the 1994 Winter Olympics
Biathletes at the 1998 Winter Olympics
Czechoslovak female biathletes
Living people
Olympic biathletes of Czechoslovakia
Olympic biathletes of the Czech Republic
Biathlon World Championships medalists